Maren Valenti (born 15 October 1976) is a German ice hockey player. She competed in the women's tournament at the 2002 Winter Olympics.

References

1976 births
Living people
German women's ice hockey players
Olympic ice hockey players of Germany
Ice hockey players at the 2002 Winter Olympics
Sportspeople from Freiburg im Breisgau